Andrea Badan (born 21 March 1998) is an Italian footballer who last played as a defender for Oldham Athletic.

Club career
He made his Serie C debut for Prato on 27 August 2017 in a game against Viterbese Castrense.

On 15 July 2019, he joined Carrarese on loan. On 29 January 2020, he moved on loan to Cavese.

On 9 September 2020, Badan joined League Two side Oldham Athletic on a two-year deal.  Badan left the club on 1st September 2021, his contract terminated by mutual consent.

References

External links
 

1998 births
Sportspeople from the Province of Padua
Living people
Italian footballers
Association football defenders
Hellas Verona F.C. players
A.C. Prato players
U.C. AlbinoLeffe players
U.S. Alessandria Calcio 1912 players
Carrarese Calcio players
Cavese 1919 players
Serie C players
Expatriate footballers in England
Italian expatriate sportspeople in England
Oldham Athletic A.F.C. players
Italian expatriate footballers
Footballers from Veneto